The 1920 United States presidential election in Montana took place on November 2, 1920 as part of the 1920 United States presidential election. Voters chose four representatives, or electors to the Electoral College, who voted for president and vice president.

Background
Like all of the Western United States, severe anger at President Woodrow Wilson's failure to maintain his promise to keep the United States out of World War I produced extreme hostility among the strongly isolationist population of remote Montana. In addition, by the beginning of 1920 skyrocketing inflation and Wilson's focus upon his proposed League of Nations at the expense of domestic policy had helped make the incumbent president very unpopular – besides which Wilson also had major health problems that had left First Lady Edith effectively running the nation. Political unrest seen in the Palmer Raids and the "Red Scare" further added to the unpopularity of the Democratic Party, since this global political turmoil produced considerable fear of alien revolutionaries invading the country. Demand in the West for exclusion of Asian immigrants became even stronger than it had been before. Another factor hurting the Democratic Party was the migration of many people from the traditionally Republican Upper Midwest into the state.

Because the West had been the chief presidential battleground ever since the "System of 1896" emerged following that election, Governor Cox traveled across the western states in August and September, but he did not visit Montana with its tiny population and poverty of electoral votes. No polls were taken in the state, but a Republican success was universally assumed.

Vote
Montana overwhelmingly voted for the Republican nominee, Senator Warren G. Harding, over the Democratic nominee, Ohio Governor James M. Cox. Harding won Montana by a landslide margin of 29.08%. Whereas Wilson had carried every county except Sweet Grass in 1916, Harding won every county except Mineral, which he lost narrowly by just fifteen votes. However, within the thirteen states north of Arizona and west of Missouri, Mineral was along with Clark County, Nevada one of only two counties to give a plurality to Cox. As of 2020, this is the last time that Deer Lodge County has given a majority of the vote to a Republican. Harding's 61.1% vote share and 29 percentage point margin remain the strongest performance by a Republican presidential nominee in Montana history.

Results

Results by county

See also
 United States presidential elections in Montana

References

Montana
1920
1920 Montana elections